A solar storm is a disturbance on the Sun, which can emanate outward across the heliosphere, affecting the entire Solar System, including Earth and its magnetosphere, and is the cause of space weather in the short-term with long-term patterns comprising space climate.

Types
Solar storms include: 

 Solar flare, a large explosion in the Sun's atmosphere caused by tangling, crossing or reorganizing of magnetic field lines
 Coronal mass ejection (CME), a massive burst of plasma from the Sun, sometimes associated with solar flares
 Geomagnetic storm, the interaction of the Sun's outburst with Earth's magnetic field
 Solar particle event (SPE), proton or energetic particle (SEP) storm

See also
 List of solar storms
 Aurora, a luminous phenomenon induced by ionization and excitation of constituents of a planet's upper atmosphere
 Heliophysics, the scientific study of the Sun and region of space affected by the Sun
 Magnetic cloud, a transient disturbance in the solar wind
 Solar cycle, an 11-year cycle of sunspot activity
 Solar cycle 25, the current cycle
 Solar prominence, a plasma and magnetic structure in the Sun's corona
 Solar wind, the stream of particles and plasma emanating from the Sun
 Active region, where most solar flares and coronal mass ejections originate

 Magnetic storm (disambiguation)
 Geo storm (disambiguation)

Solar phenomena
Space weather
Geomagnetic storms
Space hazards

da:Solstorm
pt:Tempestade solar